In Māori mythology, Hinauri is the sister of Māui and the wife of Irawaru. Māui becomes annoyed with Irawaru and stretches out his limbs, turning him into a dog. When Hinauri asks Māui if he has seen her husband, Māui tells her to call “Moi! Moi!” whereupon the poor dog runs up, and Hinauri, learning the truth, throws herself into the sea (Tregear 1891:107).

See also
 Tinirau and Kae

References
E.R. Tregear, Maori-Polynesian Comparative Dictionary (Lyon and Blair: Lambton Quay, 1891).
C. Tremewan,  Traditional Stories from Southern New Zealand: He Kōrero nō Te Wai Pounamu (Macmillan Brown Centre for Pacific Studies: Christchurch), 2002.

Legendary Māori people